FAK may refer to:

People 
 Erich Fak (born 1945), Austrian footballer
 Jakov Fak (born 1987), Croatian-Slovenian biathlete

Other uses 
 Fang language (Cameroon)
 Federasie van Afrikaanse Kultuurvereniginge, a South-African cultural organisation
 FK Austria Wien, an Austrian football club
 Focal adhesion kinase, a protein
 Kosovo Athletic Federation
 FAK, abbreviation for Forsvarsakademiet, the Royal Danish Defence College